Meshir 29 - Coptic Calendar - Paremhat 1

The thirtieth day of the Coptic month of Meshir, the sixth month of the Coptic year. In common years, this day corresponds to February 24, of the Julian Calendar, and March 9, of the Gregorian Calendar. This day falls in the Coptic Season of Shemu, the season of the Harvest.

Commemorations

Saints 

 The departure of Pope Cyril VI, the 116th Patriarch of the See of Saint Mark

Other commemorations 

 The appearance of the Head of Saint John the Baptist

References 

Days of the Coptic calendar